Countess Charlotte of Hanau-Lichtenberg, full name: Countess Charlotte Christine Magdalene Johanna of Hanau-Lichtenberg (2 May 1700, Bouxwiller – 1 July 1726, Darmstadt) was the wife of landgrave Louis VIII of Hesse-Darmstadt.

Biography

The Heiress 
Charlotte was the only surviving child of the last Count of Hanau, Johann Reinhard III, and the Countess Dorothea Friederike of Brandenburg-Ansbach.  Thus, she was the sole heir of the County of Hanau.

Marriage 

The first man to ask her hand in marriage, was the crown prince and later Landgrave William VIII of Hesse-Kassel.  Had this marriage taken place, the county of Hanau would have remained united.  However, it failed because of religious differences between William, who was a Calvinist and Charlotte, who was Lutheran.

The second candidate was the crown prince and later Landgrave Louis VIII of Hesse-Darmstadt, who was Lutheran. They were married on 5 April 1717.  From this marriage the following children were born:
 Landgrave Louis IX, married in 1741 Countess Palatine Caroline of Zweibrücken, had issue
 Prince George William, married in 1748 Countess Maria Louise Albertine of Leiningen-Dagsburg-Falkenburg, had issue
 Princess Caroline Louise;  married in 1751 Charles Frederick, Margrave of Baden, later first Grand Duke of Baden, had issue

Death 
Charlotte Christine died on 1 July 1726 in Darmstadt.  A number of funeral sermons were published in July 1726 in Darmstadt.

The inheritance 
As Charlotte Christine died before her father, her son, the future Landgrave Louis IX, became heir apparent of the County of Hanau.  This was, however, restricted to the Lichtenberg part of the county, because the Münzenberg part of the county had been awarded to the county of Hesse-Kassel in an earlier inheritance contract between Hanau and Hesse-Kassel.

A dispute arose, because it wasn't clear to which part the district of Babenhausen would belong. It escalated into a military conflict.

The dispute could be settled only after protracted litigation before the highest courts of the Empire, which in 1771 issued the so-called Partifikationsrezess.

Ancestors

References 
 Alfred Börckel: Wives of the princes of Hesse from St. Elizabeth to the present day, represented in their life and work, 2nd ed. Gießen, 1908, p. 74 ff.
 Reinhard Dietrich: The state constitution in the Land of Hanau = Hanauer history publications, vol. 34, Hanau 1996, 
 Louis William Holland: Letters of the Duchess Elisabeth Charlotte of Orleans from the years 1716 to 1718 = Library of the Literary Association, vol. 122, Tübingen 1874.
 Catalog of funeral sermons and other writings of mourning in the Hessian State Archives, Marburg = Marburg staff research journal, vol 14, Sigmaringen 1992.
 Catalog of funeral sermons and other writings of mourning in the Hessian State Archive Darmstadt = Marburger staff research journal, vol 13, Sigmaringen 1991.
 Manfred Knodt: The Regents of Hesse-Darmstadt. 2nd ed, Darmstadt 1977.
 Rudolf Lenz: Catalogue of funeral sermons and other writings of sadness in the Hesse University and State Library = Marburger staff research journal, vol 11, Sigmaringen 1990.
 Reinhard Suchier: Genealogy of Countly House of Hanau, in: Festschrift of the Hanau Historical Association for its fifty-year jubilee celebration on 27 August 1894, Hanau 1894.
 Ernst J. Zimmermann: Hanau city and country, 3rd Edition, Hanau 1919, reprinted  1978.

Footnotes 

House of Hanau
1700 births
1726 deaths